French phonology is the sound system of French. This article discusses mainly the phonology of all the varieties of Standard French. Notable phonological features include its uvular r, nasal vowels, and three processes affecting word-final sounds:

 liaison, a specific instance of sandhi in which word-final consonants are not pronounced unless they are followed by a word beginning with a vowel;
  (resyllabification) in which word-final and word-initial consonants may be moved across a syllable boundary, with syllables crossing word boundaries:

An example of the above is this:
Written: 
Meaning: "We left the window open."
In isolation: 
Together:

Consonants

Phonetic notes:
  are laminal denti-alveolar , while  are dentalised laminal alveolar  (commonly called 'dental'), pronounced with the blade of the tongue very close to the back of the upper front teeth, with the tip resting behind lower front teeth.
 Word-final consonants are always released.
  is usually apical alveolar  but sometimes laminal denti-alveolar . Before , it can be realised as retroflex .
It could be considered a separate phoneme in Meridional French, e.g. pain  ('bread') vs. penne  ('quill').
 The approximants  correspond to the close vowels . While there are a few minimal pairs (such as   's/he rented' and   'law'), there are many cases where there is free variation.
See also Glides and diphthongs, below.
 The French rhotic has a wide range of realizations: the voiced uvular fricative , also realised as an approximant , with a voiceless positional allophone , the uvular trill , the alveolar trill , and the alveolar tap . See French guttural r and map at right.
Velar palatalisation has traditionally been associated with the working class, though recent studies suggest it is spreading to more demographics of large French cities.

Geminates
Although double consonant letters appear in the orthographic form of many French words, geminate consonants are relatively rare in the pronunciation of such words. The following cases can be identified.

The conditional form il mourrait  ('he would die'), for example, contrasts with the imperfect form il mourait  ('he was dying'). Other verbs that have a double  orthographically in the future and conditional are pronounced with a simple : il pourra ('he will be able to'), il verra ('he will see').

When the prefix  combines with a base that begins with n, the resulting word is sometimes pronounced with a geminate  and similarly for the variants of the same prefix im-, il-, ir-: 
   ('innate')
   ('immortal')
   ('illegible')
   ('irresponsible')

The pronunciation of such words, in many cases, a spelling pronunciation varies by speaker and gives rise to widely varying stylistic effects. In particular, the gemination of consonants other than the liquids and nasals  is "generally considered affected or pedantic".

A few cases of gemination do not correspond to double consonant letters in the orthography. The deletion of word-internal schwas (see below), for example, can give rise to sequences of identical consonants: là-dedans  ('inside'), l'honnêteté  ('honesty'). The elided form of the object pronoun l' ('him/her/it') is also realised as a geminate  when it appears after another l to avoid misunderstanding:
Il l'a mangé  ('He ate it')
Il a mangé  ('He ate')
Gemination is obligatory in such contexts.

Finally, a word pronounced with emphatic stress can exhibit gemination of its first syllable-initial consonant:
formidable  ('terrific')
épouvantable  ('horrible')

Liaison

Many words in French can be analyzed as having a "latent" final consonant that is pronounced only in certain syntactic contexts when the next word begins with a vowel. For example, the word   ('two') is pronounced  in isolation or before a consonant-initial word (deux jours  →  'two days'), but in deux ans  (→  'two years'), the linking or liaison consonant  is pronounced.

Vowels

Standard French contrasts up to 13 oral vowels and up to 4 nasal vowels. The schwa (in the center of the diagram next to this paragraph) is not necessarily a distinctive sound. Even though it often merges with one of the mid front rounded vowels, its patterning suggests that it is a separate phoneme (see the subsection Schwa below).

The table below primarily lists vowels in contemporary Parisian French, with vowels only present in other dialects in parentheses.

Close vowels
In contrast with the mid vowels, there is no tense–lax contrast in close vowels. Laxing always occurs in stressed closed syllables, but it is also found in other environments to various degrees.

Mid vowels
Although the mid vowels contrast in certain environments, there is a limited distributional overlap so they often appear in complementary distribution. Generally, close-mid vowels are found in open syllables, and open-mid vowels are found in closed syllables. However, there are minimal pairs:
 open-mid  and close-mid  contrast in final-position open syllables:
   ('was going'), vs.   ('gone');
 likewise, open-mid  and  contrast with close-mid  and  mostly in closed monosyllables, such as these:
   ('young'), vs.   ('fast', verb),
   ('rock'), vs.   ('hoarse'),
   ('Rhodes'), vs.   ('[I] lurk'),
   ('Paul', masculine), vs.   ('Paule', feminine),
   ('good', feminine), vs.   ('Beaune', the city).

Beyond the general rule, known as the loi de position among French phonologists, there are some exceptions.

Open vowels
The phonemic contrast between front  and back  is sometimes not maintained in Standard French, which leads some researchers to reject the idea of two distinct phonemes. However, the distinction is still clearly maintained in other dialects such as Quebec French.

While there is much variation among speakers in France, a number of general tendencies can be observed. First of all, the distinction is most often preserved in word-final stressed syllables such as in these minimal pairs:
   →  ('stain'), vs.   →  ('task')
   →  ('leg'), vs.   →  ('paste, pastry')
   →  ('rat'), vs.   →  ('short')

There are certain environments that prefer one open vowel over the other. For example,  is preferred after  and before :
   ('three'),
   ('gas').

The difference in quality is often reinforced by a difference in length (but the difference is contrastive in final closed syllables). The exact distribution of the two vowels varies greatly from speaker to speaker.

Back  is much rarer in unstressed syllables, but it can be encountered in some common words:
   ('castle'),
   ('past').

Morphologically complex words derived from words containing stressed  do not retain it:
   →  ('aged', from   → )
 rarissime  →  ('very rare', from   → ).

Even in the final syllable of a word, back  may become  if the word in question loses its stress within the extended phonological context:
 J'ai été au bois  →  ('I went to the woods'),
 J'ai été au bois de Vincennes  →  ('I went to the Vincennes woods').

Nasal vowels
The phonetic qualities of the back nasal vowels differ from those of the corresponding oral vowels. Speakers who produce both  and  distinguish them mainly through increased lip rounding of the former, but many speakers use only the latter phoneme, especially most speakers in northern France such as Paris (but not farther north, in Belgium).

In Quebec French, two of the vowels shift in a different direction:  → , more or less as in Europe, but  →  and  → .

In the Provence and Occitanie regions, nasal vowels are often realized as oral vowels before a stop consonant, thus reviving the  otherwise lost in other accents: quarante  → .

Contrary to the oral , there is no attested tendency for the nasal  to become central in any accent.

Schwa
When phonetically realised, schwa, also called e  ('dropped e') and e  ('mute e'), is a mid-central vowel with some rounding. Geoff Lindsey suggests the symbol .  state, more specifically, that it merges with  before high vowels and glides:
   →  ('clarity'),
   →  ('workshop'),
in phrase-final stressed position:
 dis-le !  →  ('say it'),
and that it merges with  elsewhere. However, some speakers make a clear distinction, and it exhibits special phonological behavior that warrants considering it a distinct phoneme.

The main characteristic of French schwa is its "instability": the fact that under certain conditions it has no phonetic realization.
 That is usually the case when it follows a single consonant in a medial syllable:
   →  ('to call'),
 It is occasionally mute in word-final position:
   →  ('door').
 Word-final schwas are optionally pronounced if preceded by two or more consonants and followed by a consonant-initial word:
 une porte fermée  →  ('a closed door').
 In the future and conditional forms of -er verbs, however, the schwa is sometimes deleted even after two consonants :
 tu garderais  →  ('you would guard'),
 nous brusquerons [les choses]  →  ('we will precipitate [things]').
 On the other hand, it is pronounced word-internally when it follows more pronounced consonants that cannot be combined into a complex onset with the initial consonants of the next syllable:
   →  ('scoundrel'),
 sept petits  →  ('seven little ones').

In French versification, word-final schwa is always elided before another vowel and at the ends of verses. It is pronounced before a following consonant-initial word. For example, une grande femme fut ici,  in ordinary speech, would in verse be pronounced , with the  enunciated at the end of each word.

Schwa cannot normally be realised as a front vowel in closed syllables. In such contexts in inflectional and derivational morphology, schwa usually alternates with the front vowel :
   →  ('to harass'), with
 il harcèle  →  ('[he] harasses').

A three-way alternation can be observed, in a few cases, for a number of speakers:
   →  ('to call'),
 j'appelle  →  ('I call'),
   →  ('brand'), which can also be pronounced .

Instances of orthographic  that do not exhibit the behaviour described above may be better analysed as corresponding to the stable, full vowel . The enclitic pronoun , for example, always keeps its vowel in contexts like donnez-le-moi  →  ('give it to me') for which schwa deletion would normally apply (giving *), and it counts as a full syllable for the determination of stress.

Length
Vowels can be lengthened in closed, stressed syllables, under the following two conditions:

When such syllables lose their stress, the lengthening effect may be absent.

The following table presents the pronunciation of a representative sample of words in phrase-final (stressed) position:

Devoicing
In Parisian French, the close vowels  and the mid front  at the end of utterances can be devoiced. A devoiced vowel may be followed by a sound similar to the voiceless palatal fricative :
 Merci.  →  ('Thank you.'),
 Allez !  →  ('Go!').

In Quebec French, close vowels are often devoiced when unstressed and surrounded by voiceless consonants:
 université  →  ('university').
Though a more prominent feature of Quebec French, phrase-medial devoicing is also found in European French.

Elision

The final vowel (usually ) of a number of monosyllabic function words is elided in syntactic combinations with a following word that begins with a vowel. For example, compare the pronunciation of the unstressed subject pronoun, in je dors   ('I am sleeping'), and in j'arrive   ('I am arriving').

Glides and diphthongs
nie ;   ('deny')
loue ;   ('rent')
tue ;   ('kill')
The glides in the examples can be analyzed as the result of a glide formation process that turns an underlying high vowel into a glide when followed by another vowel:  → .

Some sequences of glide + vowel can be found after obstruent-liquid onsets, however.

Glide formation normally does not occur across morpheme boundaries in compounds like semi-aride ('semi-arid').

Schane (1968) proposes an abstract analysis deriving postvocalic  from an underlying lateral by palatalization and glide conversion ( →  → ).

Stress
Word stress is not distinctive in French, so two words cannot be distinguished based on stress placement alone. Grammatical stress is always on the final full syllable (syllable with a vowel other than schwa) of a word. Monosyllables with schwa as their only vowel (etc.) are generally clitics but otherwise may receive stress.

The difference between stressed and unstressed syllables in French is less marked than in English. Vowels in unstressed syllables keep their full quality, regardless of whether the rhythm of the speaker is syllable-timed or mora-timed (see isochrony). Moreover, words lose their stress to varying degrees when pronounced in phrases and sentences. In general, only the last word in a phonological phrase retains its full grammatical stress (on its last full syllable).

Emphatic stress
Emphatic stress is used to call attention to a specific element in a given context such as to express a contrast or to reinforce the emotive content of a word. In French, this stress falls on the first consonant-initial syllable of the word in question. The characteristics associated with emphatic stress include increased amplitude and pitch of the vowel and gemination of the onset consonant, as mentioned above. Emphatic stress does not replace, but occurs in tandem with, grammatical stress.
C'est parfaitement vrai.  ('It's perfectly true.'; no emphatic stress)
C'est parfaitement vrai.  (emphatic stress on parfaitement)

For words that begin with a vowel, emphatic stress falls on the first syllable that begins with a consonant or on the initial syllable with the insertion of a glottal stop or a liaison consonant.
C'est épouvantable.  ('It's terrible.'; emphatic stress on second syllable of épouvantable)
C'est épouvantable !  (initial syllable with liaison consonant )
C'est épouvantable !  (initial syllable with glottal stop insertion)

Intonation

French intonation differs substantially from that of English. There are four primary patterns:

The continuation pattern is a rise in pitch occurring in the last syllable of a rhythm group (typically a phrase).
The finality pattern is a sharp fall in pitch occurring in the last syllable of a declarative statement.
The yes/no intonation is a sharp rise in pitch occurring in the last syllable of a yes/no question.
The information question intonation is a rapid fall-off from a high pitch on the first word of a non-yes/no question, often followed by a small rise in pitch on the last syllable of the question.

See also

History of French
Phonological history of French
Varieties of French
French orthography
Reforms of French orthography
Phonologie du Français Contemporain
Quebec French phonology

References

Sources

External links

Foreign Service Institute's freely downloadable course on French phonology
Introduction to French Phonology (audio)
Introduction to French Phonology (student & teacher texts)
Large collection of recordings of French words
mp3 Audio Pronunciation of French vowels, consonants and alphabet
French Vowels Demonstrated by a Native Speaker (youtube)
French Consonants Demonstrated by a Native Speaker (youtube)

 
Phonology

de:Französische Sprache#Aussprache